This is a list of notable individuals born in the United States of Lebanese ancestry and/or people of Lebanese and American dual nationality who live or lived in the United States.

Arts and entertainment

Artists
 Etel Adnan – painter, poet
 Margot Douaihy – writer
 Chawky Frenn – painter and art professor
 Kahlil Gibran – aka Kahlil G. Gibran, artist, sculptor
 Nabil Kanso – painter
 Sam Maloof – woodworker

Beauty pageant contestants
 Rima Fakih – Miss USA 2010

Entertainment personalities
 Adam Amen – reality star, from TLC program All American Muslim
 Alexander Koch – actor of Lebanese, Italian and German descent
 Amy Yasbeck – actress (father was of Lebanese descent)
 Anissa Jones – child actor (mother was of Lebanese descent)
 Callie Khouri – Oscar-winning screenwriter
 Casey Kasem – radio personality, American Top 40 franchise; voiceover actor (cartoon series Scooby-Doo, Transformers)
 Catherine Keener – actress, mother of Lebanese descent
 Celeste Thorson – actress, model, activist, screenwriter
 Chris Romano – actor, producer, director (father of Lebanese heritage, born Shaheen)
 Cristina Vee – singer and voice actor
 Demián Bichir – Mexican-American film actor of Lebanese heritage
 Dan Jbara – television and film producer
 Danny Thomas – actor
 David Yazbek – musician and composer famous for the Broadway musical The Full Monty
 Diane Rehm – host and executive producer of The Diane Rehm Show on National Public Radio
 Edy Ganem – actress (parents are of Lebanese descent)
 Elie Samaha – film producer
 Emeraude Toubia – actress (father is Lebanese)
 Emile Kuri – Mexican-born American Oscar-winning art director
 Frank Lackteen – actor
 Gregory Jbara – television and film actor 
 George Nader – actor, uncle of Michael Nader
 George Noory – radio host (radio program Coast To Coast AM)
 Haaz Sleiman – actor (series Nurse Jackie; film The Visitor)
 Hank the Angry Drunken Dwarf – radio and television personality
 James Stacy – film and television actor
 Jamie Farr – actor (sitcom M*A*S*H)
 Jamie Gray Hyder – actress, model (father of Lebanese descent)
 Jane Wiedlin – musician, actress (mother was of Lebanese descent)
 Jenna Dewan – actress (paternal grandfather was of Lebanese descent)
 Kristen Doute – television personality known for Vanderpump Rules
 Joan Alexander – actress known for her role as Lois Lane
 John A. Kuri – author and writer, film and television producer, and director
 John Leguizamo – actor (maternal grandfather was Lebanese)
 Kathy Najimy – actress
 Kerri Kasem – radio and television host; daughter of Casey Kasem
 Khrystyne Haje – actress (sitcom Head of the Class)
 Lili Estefan – Cuban-American television personality, niece of Emilio Estefan
 Marlo Thomas – actress (father was of Lebanese descent)
 Mario Kassar – filmmaker, founder of Carolco Pictures
 Mary Zilba – television personality and singer 
 Mayssa Karaa – Grammy-nominated singer
 Mia Khalifa – pornographic actress and adult model
 Michael Ansara – stage, screen, and voice actor (Lebanese born American)
 Michael Nader – actor, All My Children and Dynasty
 Michael Nouri – actor, film Flashdance
 Mo Gallini – actor (father of Lebanese descent)
 Paola Turbay – Colombian-American actress, model, beauty queen and television presenter 
 Paul Anka – singer-songwriter, actor, producer
 Peter Macdissi – film and television actor
 Raya Meddine – actress of Lebanese descent
 Robert Romanus – actor and musician
 Rose Abdoo – comedian, actress
 Rowan Blanchard – actress (father of Lebanese descent)
 Salma Hayek – Mexican-American actress (paternal grandfather was Lebanese) 
 Senta Moses – actress known for her role in Home Alone
 Shannon Elizabeth – actress (father of Lebanese descent)
 Terrence Malick – filmmaker, of part Lebanese descent
 Tom Shadyac – film director (of 3/4 Lebanese descent)
 Tony Shalhoub – actor (Monk)
 Tony Thomas – producer (father was of Lebanese descent)
 Vince Vaughn – actor (paternal grandmother was of Lebanese descent)
 Wentworth Miller – actor, maternal great-grandmother of Lebanese descent
 Yasmeen Fletcher – actress and musician, mother of Lebanese descent
 Yasmine Al Massri – Lebanese-born American actress

Fashion designers
 Elie Saab – fashioner designer 
 Joseph Abboud – fashion designer
 Reem Acra – fashion designer
 Norma Kamali – fashion designer

Musicians
 Andrew Bazzi – pop musician
 Dick Dale – rock guitarist and surf music pioneer
 Emilio Estefan – Cuban-American musician and producer; husband of Gloria Estefan
 G. E. Smith – lead guitarist in the band Hall & Oates; musical director of Saturday Night Live
 Hamed Sinno – Lebanese-American graphic designer, singer-songwriter of the band Mashrou'Leila
 Jack Barakat – guitarist of the band All Time Low
 Jane Wiedlin – musician, singer-songwriter, and actress; best known as a member of the all-female new wave band The Go-Go's
 John Dolmayan – Lebanese-American of Armenian descent, drummer of band System of a Down
 Kat Dahlia – singer-songwriter, rapper
 Mohammed El-Bakkar – tenor singer, oud player, and conductor
 Nadia Azzi – pianist
 Paul Anka – singer-songwriter (both parents of Lebanese descent)
 Paul Jabara – composer
 Neil Sedaka – pop/rock singer, pianist, composer and record producer
 Ron Affif – jazz guitarist and musician
 Rosalind Elias – opera singer renowned for her time in the Metropolitan Opera
 Serj Tankian – Lebanese-American of Armenian descent, lead singer of band System of a Down
 Soraya – Colombian-American singer
 Tiffany – singer
 Tino Coury – singer-songwriter and producer
 Tiny Tim – folk singer
 Tyler Joseph – lead singer of Twenty One Pilots

Business
 Alec Gores – entrepreneur
 Caroline Ghosn – entrepreneur
 Charles Elachi – director of Jet Propulsion Laboratory
 Clifford Antone – founder of Antone's blues club in Austin, Texas
 Debra Cafaro – CEO of Ventas Inc., a healthcare real estate investment trust
 Fares D. Noujaim – business executive
 Frédéric Fekkai – French-American hairdresser and founder of Frédéric Fekkai salons and hair products
 George Joseph – founder of Mercury Insurance Group
 George J. Maloof Jr. – businessman and owner of the Sacramento Monarchs, Sacramento Kings and the Palms Casino Resort in Las Vegas 
 George J. Maloof Sr. – businessman and former owner of the Houston Rockets
 Jacques Nasser – former CEO of Ford Motor Company
 Jean Succar Kuri – businessman
 Joe Jamail – attorney and businessman
 Joe Robbie – attorney and original owner of the Miami Dolphins
 John J. Mack – former CEO of investment bank Morgan Stanley (2005–2009)
 Joseph J. Jacobs – former chairman and founder of the Jacobs Engineering Group
 Madeleine A. Pickens – business executive 
 Magid Abraham – market research expert and businessman
 Manuel Moroun – businessman and the owner of the Ambassador Bridge
 Michael Boulos – business executive and partner of Tiffany Trump
 Moose Scheib – founder and CEO of LoanMod.com
 Paul Orfalea – founder of Kinko's
 Richard Rainwater (1944-2015) – investor and philanthropist
 Richard Rashid – founder of Microsoft Research
 Robert Khuzami – former director of the U.S. Securities and Exchange Commission 
 Thomas J. Barrack Jr. – businessman and founder of Colony Capital
 Tony Fadell – product development manager at Apple Inc.
 Tony Tamer – founder and Co-CEO of H.I.G. Capital and 451st richest person in the world.

Education and academics 
 Charbel Farhat – Vivian Church Hoff Professor of Aircraft Structures in the School of Engineering and inaugural James and Anna Marie Spilker Chair of the Department of Aeronautics and Astronautics, at Stanford University; Member of the National Academy of Engineering (US); Member of the Royal Academy of Engineering (UK); and Member of the Lebanese Academy of Sciences
 Joseph E. Aoun – President of Northeastern University
Nafe Katter – professor of theatre, University of Connecticut
 Robert Khayat – Chancellor of the University of Mississippi
 Donna Shalala – U.S. Representative from Florida, former U.S. Secretary of Health and Human Services and former President of the University of Miami
 Phoebe Stanton – faculty at Johns Hopkins University from 1955 until 1982, art historian, urban planner for the city of Baltimore.
 Gabriel Hawawini – emeritus professor of finance and former holder of the Henry Grunfeld Chair in Investment Banking at INSEAD

History
 Akram Fouad Khater – professor, author, expert on Lebanese-American studies
 Philip Khuri Hitti – historian of Arab culture and history

Journalism
 Anthony Shadid – foreign correspondent for The New York Times and earlier The Boston Globe
 Brian Karem – journalist and White House correspondent
 Helen Thomas – journalist who covered every U.S. President from 1961 to 2010
 Jad Abumrad – radio host, composer, and producer, founder and co-host of the syndicated public radio program Radiolab
 Jim Avila – senior correspondent for ABC News
 Leila Fadel – Journalist for National Public Radio 
 Lucie Salhany – first woman to head a broadcast television network in 1993 in the position as Chairman of Fox Broadcasting Company
 Octavia Nasr – former television journalist for CNN
 Paula Faris – journalist (father was of Lebanese descent)
 Raghida Dergham – columnist and senior diplomatic correspondent for the London-based Al Hayat
 Sara Ganim – CNN journalist (father is of Lebanese descent)
 Serena Shim – journalist
 Tamsen Fadal – television journalist
 Walid Phares – security and anti-terrorism expert

Medicine
 Amin J. Barakat – physician, known for the diagnosis of Barakat syndrome
 Charles Sophy – psychiatrist
 Daniel Amen – psychiatrist and author
 George Hatem – "Ma Haide," a founder of the public health system in China
 M. Amin Arnaout – nephrologist and physician-scientist
 Michael DeBakey – heart surgeon, medical innovator
 Paul Nassif – facial plastic surgeon, co-star on the television series Botched

Military
 Alfred Naifeh – U.S. Navy lieutenant posthumously awarded the Navy and Marine Corps Medal in WWII and namesake of a U.S. Navy ship, USS Naifeh (DE-352)
 Ernest "Iron Mike" Massad – U.S. Army major general
 George Joulwan – retired U.S. Army general
 James Jabara – first American jet ace
 John Abizaid – retired general in the United States Army 
 Michael A. Monsoor – U.S. Navy SEAL awarded Medal of Honor after being killed during the Iraq War

Politics

Activists
 Jahaira DeAlto – domestic violence victims and LGBT community activist and advocate
 Brigitte Gabriel – founder of non-profit political organizations American Congress For Truth and ACT! for America; author; formerly journalist in Israel working for World News
 Candy Lightner – activist and founder of Mothers Against Drunk Drivers
 James Zogby – founder of the Arab-American Institute
 Jill Kelley – international advocate, socialite, and former diplomat 
 John Zogby – pollster; founder of Zogby International

Politicians
 Abraham Kazen – former U.S. representative from Texas
 Alex Azar – former United States Secretary of Health and Human Services
 Charles Boustany – former U.S. representative from Louisiana
 Charlie Crist – U.S. representative from Florida and former governor of Florida
 Chris Greeley – former Maine state representative
 Chris John – former U.S. representative from Louisiana
 Chris Sununu – Governor of New Hampshire
 Darin LaHood – Republican representative from Illinois
 Darrell Issa – U.S. representative from California
 David Karem – member of Kentucky Senate from 1976 to 2004
 Debbie Mucarsel-Powell – U.S. representative from Florida
 Donna Shalala – U.S. representative from Florida and former U.S. Secretary of Health and Human Services
 Edward M. Gabriel – Former U.S. ambassador to Morocco
 Francis Slay – former mayor of Saint Louis
 Garret Graves – U.S. representative from Louisiana
 George A. Kasem – former U.S. representative from California
 George J. Mitchell – former U.S. senator from Maine 
 Gwen Graham – former U.S. representative from Florida
 James Abdnor – former U.S. senator and U.S. representative from South Dakota
 James Abourezk – former U.S. senator from South Dakota
 Jeanine Pirro – politician, judge and television host
 John Baldacci – former governor of Maine
 John E. Sununu – former U.S. senator and U.S. representative from New Hampshire
 John H. Sununu – former White House Chief of Staff; former governor of New Hampshire
 Katcho Achadjian – former California State Assembly member, of Armenian descent 
 Manuel Maloof – former U.S. government official and businessman 
 Mary Rose Oakar – former U.S. representative from Ohio
 Nick Rahall – former U.S. representative from West Virginia
 Nico LaHood – Bexar County district attorney, Texas
 Pat Danner – former U.S. representative from Missouri 
 Philip Habib – former U.S. ambassador and envoy 
 Ralph Abraham – U.S. representative from Louisiana
 Ralph Nader – political activist and former U.S. presidential candidate (Green Party)
 Ray LaHood – former U.S. Transportation Secretary and former U.S. representative from Illinois
 Richard L. Hanna – former U.S. representative from New York
 Richard Ieyoub – former Attorney General of Louisiana
 Selwa Roosevelt – former U.S. government official
 Spencer Abraham – former U.S. senator from Michigan
 Suzanne Haik Terrell – former Louisiana elections commissioner
 Toby Moffett – former U.S. representative from Connecticut 
 Victor G. Atiyeh – former governor of Oregon
 Vincent Sheheen – member of the South Carolina senate
 Sam H. Zakhem – member of the Colorado State House of Representatives. Colorado state senator. Former US ambassador to Bahrain under Ronald Reagan

Other personalities
 Adele Khoury Graham – educator and former first lady of the State of Florida
 George Noory – radio host of Coast to Coast AM; author; entertainer
 Joseph Farah – author and journalist
 Nassim Nicholas Taleb – best-selling author, risk expert and statistician, university professor, and former trader and business person
 Robert Khuzami, U.S. deputy attorney for Southern District of New York
 Timothy Massad – U.S. Treasury Department official and corporate lawyer
 Victoria Reggie Kennedy – attorney and widow of U.S. Senator Edward Kennedy
 Najeeb Halaby – administrator of the Federal Aviation Administration and father of Queen Noor of Jordan

Sciences
 Anthony Atala – director of the Wake Forest Institute for Regenerative Medicine
 Charbel Farhat – director, Army High Performance Computing Research Center, Stanford University, and Member of National Academy of Engineering
 Charles Elachi – director of NASA Jet Propulsion Labs
 Christa McAuliffe – secondary school teacher and first American civilian selected to be an astronaut; perished in the Space Shuttle Challenger disaster; great niece of historian Philip Khuri Hitti
 Elias Corey – 1990 Nobel Prize winner in Chemistry
 Hassan Kamel Al-Sabbah – technology innovator
 Michael Debakey – doctor and heart surgeon, medical innovator

Sports

Athletes
 Abe Mickal – football player for LSU
 Bobby Rahal – professional car racer and team owner
 Charley Zivic – professional boxer
 Damien Sandow – professional wrestler in the WWE
 David Azzi – professional football player
 Doug Flutie – former professional football player
 Fred Saigh – lawyer; real estate investor; owner of the American professional baseball franchise the St. Louis Cardinals
 Graham Rahal – professional car racer
 Jackson Vroman – former professional basketball player and member of Lebanon's national basketball team (naturalized Lebanese citizen)
 Jeff George – former NFL quarterback for the Indianapolis Colts
 Jim Harrick – former head coach of the University of Georgia Bull Dogs
 Joe Lahoud – former Major League Baseball outfielder
 Joe Vogel – professional basketball player and member of Lebanon's national basketball team
John Elway - Hall of Fame NFL quarterback for the Denver Broncos
 John Grabow – former Major League Baseball pitcher
 John Jaha – former first baseman in Major League Baseball, played for the Milwaukee Brewers and Oakland Athletics
 Johnny Manziel – professional football player
 Jordyn Wieber – Olympic gymnast and gold medallist 
 Liz Carmouche – mixed martial artist
 Matt Freije – ex-NBA player and member of Lebanon national basketball team 
 Matt Kalil – professional football player
 Mikie Mahtook – Major League Baseball outfielder
 Mikie Mahtook – Major League Baseball outfielder
 Patrick Maroon – ice hockey player for the Edmonton Oilers in the NHL
 Paul Rabil – former professional lacrosse player
 Petey Sarron – former featherweight boxing champion 
 Rich Kotite – former National Football League player and coach
 Robert Saleh – professional football coach and head coach of the New York Jets
 Robert Watkins – former professional football player; of African-American and Lebanese descent
 Rony Seikaly – former professional basketball player in the NBA and for both the U.S. and Lebanon's national basketball team
 Ryan Kalil – professional football player 
 Sabu – professional wrestler, real name Terry Brunk
 Sage Karam – professional car racer
 Samir Bannout – former professional bodybuilder and winner of Mr. Olympia title in 1983
 Skandor Akbar – former professional wrestler
 Soony Saad – professional soccer forward player 
 Steve Kerr – retired professional basketball player and current head coach of the Golden State Warriors
 Toni Breidinger - professional race car driver

World Series of Poker champions
 Ihsan "Sammy" Farha – three-time WSOP-bracelet winner
 Jennifer Shahade – two-time United States Women's champion; has the FIDE title of woman grandmaster
 Kassem "Freddy" Deeb – two-time WSOP-bracelet winner
 Joe Hachem – WSOP main event winner and a WPT championship winner (1 of 6 players in the world to win both)

Writers
 Ameen Rihani – author
 D. H. Melhem – poet, novelist, and editor
 Geoff Johns – comic book writer
 Khalil Gibran – author and philosopher
 Lee Francis – poet
 Mikha'il Na'ima – author and poet
 Nassim Nicholas Taleb – essayist
 Paula Gunn Allen – Native American poet and activist
 Rabih Alameddine – author
 Raymond Khoury – novelist and screenwriter
 Saree Makdisi – author and literary critic
 Stephen Karam – playwright
 Vance Bourjaily – novelist
 William Peter Blatty – writer, screenwriter

See also
 Lebanese Americans
 Lebanon–United States relations
 List of Lebanese people
 List of Lebanese people (diaspora)
 Arab Americans
 Lebanese Canadian

References

United States
Lists of American people by ethnic or national origin
Lebanese